Badnaam is a Pakistani grunge band from Lahore, Pakistan. It is the runners up band of Pepsi Battle of the Bands Season 2 in 2017. Formed in 2009, the band has played for numerous shows throughout Pakistan before performing in Pepsi Battle of the Bands. The three-member band consists of Ahmed Jilani (vocalist and lead guitarist), Lala Ahsan (drummer), and Raheem Shahbaz Sunny (bassist). The band also performed the team anthem 'Quetta Kai Kai' for Quetta Gladiators in the 4th Edition of Pakistan Super League. The band gained popularity because of their sufi rock and grunge genre and their combination of a unique performing style and use of strong vocals.

Pepsi Battle of the Bands 
After ending up as the runners up in Pepsi Battle of the Bands, Badnaam released Aik Nuktay as part of their album along with Kashmir at a star studded evening in Avari Towers in Karachi. The albums were released by Pepsi.

Discography

Pepsi Battle of the Bands 

 Alif Allah
 Kala Jora Pa
 Bismillah Karan
 Ishqnaama (Mashup) 
 Daastan-e-Faqeer
 Sham-e-Qalandar
 Khawaja Ki Deewani 
 Kalyaan Ishq 
 Deh Khudaya

Debut albums 

 Ishq Mein Tere
 Aik Nuktay
 Zindagi

Ready Steady No 

 Chham Chham - Ready Steady No

Pakistan Super League 

 Quetta Kai Kai

Band members 

 Ahmed Jilani 
 Lala Ahsan
 Raheem Shahbaz Sunny

Nominations 

 Nominated in Lux Style Awards in 2018 for Khwaji Ki Deewani in Best Emerging Talent Category
Shan-e-Pakistan Awards 2018 for Best Rock Song

See also 
 List of Pakistani music bands

References

External links 
Badnaam on YouTube

Grunge musical groups
2009 establishments in Pakistan
Musical groups from Lahore